Cavalier in Devil's Castle, also known as  The Cavaliers of Devil's Castle, is a 1959 Italian swashbuckler film written and directed  by Mario Costa and starring Massimo Serato, Irène Tunc and Luisella Boni.

Plot 
Ugone di Collefeltro has succeeded through a stratagem to imprison his uncle, Count Oliviero, legitimate lord of the fief of Valgrande, and is now trying to obtain from him a document in which the count declares to give him his rights. But the count refuses to sign such a declaration. Then Ugone calls Countess Isabella, daughter of Oliviero, back to her castle, with the intention of marrying her, thus becoming the legitimate owner of the fief.

Cast 

 Massimo Serato as  Captain Ugone di Collefeltro
 Irène Tunc as Marquise Fiamma
 Luisella Boni as Countess  Isabella
 Pierre Cressoy as Astolfo
 Livio Lorenzon as Guidobaldo Fortebraccio
 Maria Sima as Violante
 Carlo Tamberlani  as Conte Oliviero
 Aldo Bufi Landi as Duccio
 Luciano Marin as Gianetto 
 Ugo Sasso	
 Amedeo Trilli
 Miranda Campa 	
 Ignazio Balsamo	
 Gina Mascetti 
 Franco Fantasia

References

External links

 
1959 adventure films
1959 films
Italian adventure films 
Films directed by Mario Costa
Italian swashbuckler films
1950s Italian films